Rapsodie espagnole is an orchestral rhapsody written by Maurice Ravel. Composed between 1907 and 1908, the Rapsodie is one of Ravel's first major works for orchestra. It was first performed in Paris in 1908 and quickly entered the international repertoire. The piece draws on the composer's Spanish heritage and is one of several of his works set in or reflecting Spain.

Background
The genesis of the Rapsodie was a Habanera, for two pianos, which Ravel wrote in 1895. It was not published as a separate piece, and in 1907 he composed three companion pieces. A two-piano version was completed by October of that year, and the suite was fully orchestrated the following February. At about this time there was a distinctly Spanish tone to Ravel's output, perhaps reflecting his own Spanish ancestry. His opera L'heure espagnole was completed in 1907, as was the song "Vocalise-Etude en forme de habanera".

In the interval between the composition of the original Habanera and the completion of the four-movement Rapsodie, Claude Debussy had published a piano suite, Estampes (1903), of which the middle section, "Soirée dans Grenade", had a Spanish theme. To counter any accusations of plagiarism, Ravel made certain that the date 1895 was clearly printed for his Habanera in the published score of the Rapsodie.

The première of the Rapsodie was given by the Orchestre des Concerts Colonne, conducted by Édouard Colonne, at the Théâtre du Châtelet on 15 March 1908. The critical reception was generally favourable. Dissenting voices were Pierre Lalo, who habitually disliked Ravel's music, and Gaston Carraud, who called the score "slender, inconsistent and fugitive". Otherwise there was much praise for the subtle and fresh orchestration and the picturesqueness of the music. The work was soon taken up internationally. Henry Wood gave the British premiere in October 1909 to a capacity audience at the Proms, and the following month the work was first given in New York.<ref>"Philharmonic Society", The New York Times, 22 September 1909 </ref>

Music

Instrumentation
The work is scored for an orchestra of 2 piccolos, 2 flutes, 2 oboes, cor anglais, 2 soprano clarinets, bass clarinet, 3 bassoons, sarrusophone*, 4 horns, 3 trumpets, 3 trombones, tuba, timpani, bass drum, cymbals, castanets, tambourine, gong, snare drum, xylophone, celesta, 2 harps and strings.

Modern performances typically use a contrabassoon

Structure
The Rapsodie has four movements; a complete performance typically lasts around 15 minutes.

1. Prélude à la nuit
The whole movement is quiet, never rising above mezzo forte; the strings are muted throughout. As in the String Quartet of three years earlier Ravel places themes in the opening movement that recur in subsequent sections, most particularly the insistent opening theme, F–E–D–C.

2. Malagueña
This is the shortest of the four movements, and is marked assez vif ("fairly lively"). Malagueña refers to a flamenco dance from the southern Spanish province of Málaga, but Ravel's music here has only the   meter in common with the authentic dance. The movement is instead what the critic Noël Goodwin calls "more a romantic evocation of place and mood". Like the first movement, it is in the key of A, though slightly ambiguous as to whether it is major or minor. The movement ends quietly with a repeat of the four note phrase that opens the first movement.

3. Habanera
Goodwin describes it as "beguiling and subtle in its expression of a thoroughly Spanish character and spirit".

4. It is the longest of the four movements, and is the first point in the score at which Ravel, in Nichols's phrase allows "the élan'' that has so far been deliberately stifled" to break out. The boisterous carnival atmosphere has undertones of nostalgia, but exuberance triumphs and the work ends in a joyful burst of orchestral colour.

Notes, references and sources

Notes

References

Sources

External links
 

Compositions by Maurice Ravel
1908 compositions
Compositions for symphony orchestra
Compositions for piano four-hands
Espagnole